Soldiers of Fortune is the eighth studio album by American southern rock band Outlaws, released in 1986 (See 1986 in music), and the first with original guitarist Henry Paul since 1977's Hurry Sundown. A video was shot for "One Last Ride", but the album sold poorly.

Track listing
"One Last Ride" (Randy Bishop, Chuck Glass) – 4:26
"Soldiers of Fortune" (R. Bishop, L.C. Cohen, Henry Paul, Hughie Thomasson, Alan Walden) – 3:32
"The Night Cries" (R. Bishop, Cohen, Paul, Thomasson) – 4:36
"The Outlaw" (Duane Evans, Steve Grisham, Paul) – 3:49
"Cold Harbor" (Glass, Paul) – 4:26
"Whatcha Don't Do" (Thomasson, Paul, John Townsend) – 3:50
"Just the Way I Like It" (Spencer Proffer, Billy Thorpe) – 4:02
"Saved by the Bell" (R. Bishop, Jon Butcher) – 3:56
"Lady Luck" (Evans, Grisham, Paul) – 3:52
"Racin' for the Red Light" (Bishop, Freddie Salem, Thomasson) – 6:03

Personnel

Band members
Henry Paul - guitar, vocals, background vocals
Hughie Thomasson - guitar, vocals, background vocals
Steve Grisham - guitar, vocals, background vocals
Chuck Glass - bass, keyboards, vocals, background vocals
David Dix - percussion, drums

Additional musicians
Randy Bishop - keyboards, programming, backing vocals
Jon Butcher, Bart Bishop, John Townsend, Stacey Lyn Shaffer - backing vocals
Buster McNeil - guitar, backing vocals
Jimmy Glenn - drums

Production
Producer: Randy Bishop
Executive producer: Spencer Proffer
Engineer: Hanspeter Huber

Charts
Album

References

Outlaws (band) albums
1986 albums
Pasha Records albums